Angel Maxine Opoku  is a Ghanaian musician. Maxine is known as the first Ghanaian openly transgender musician.

Early life and education
Raised in the coastal city of Tema, Maxine says that her home was "deeply religious and musical" and was where she took to music at a young age.  She attended the Ghana Secondary School in Koforidua for her senior high school education and later the University of Ghana for a food safety and nutrition degree. She later attended the Regional Maritime University. Angel grew up in the coastal city of Tema, as the son of a reverend and a prophetess.

Music career
Angel started her music career in 2020 with her first single titled Sweetness (D3d33d3). She later went on to release Wo Fie which featured Wanlov the Kubolor and Sister Deborah and then Kill The Bill in 2021. Her song Kill The Bill is a campaign song against the new Ghanaian anti-LGBT bill. Her latest single, titled "Prep" is a song about a medication which prevents you from contracting HIV. It was released on November 30, 2022.

Activism
Angel Maxine is an open advocate for LGBT+ rights in Ghana and has been vocal about her rejection of the proposed Ghanaian anti-LGBT bill which is before the Parliament of Ghana as of July 2022.

Discography

Singles

References

Living people
21st-century Ghanaian musicians
Year of birth missing (living people)
Transgender women musicians
21st-century LGBT people
LGBT in Ghana
Ghanaian LGBT people